Walter de Bidun († 1178) was a clerk of King William of Scotland, Chancellor of Scotland and Bishop-elect of Dunkeld. Walter was a witness to a charter that granted the mainland properties of Iona Abbey, then under the rule of the Lord of the Isles, to the Monks of Holyrood Abbey. He was elected to the bishopric of Dunkeld in 1178 after the death of the previous bishop, Richard. However, Walter did not live long enough to receive consecration, and in fact he too met his death in the year 1178.

Walter was the son of Halenald de Bidun, a landowner and minor lord in England.

References

Notes

Sources
Cowan, Samuel, The Lord Chancellors of Scotland Edinburgh 1911. 
Dowden, John, The Bishops of Scotland, ed. J. Maitland Thomson, (Glasgow, 1912)

External links
Dauvit Broun's list of 12th century Scottish Bishops

Lord chancellors of Scotland
Bishops of Dunkeld (non consecrated, titular or doubtful)
12th-century births
1178 deaths
Clerks
12th-century Scottish Roman Catholic bishops